The Chahamanas of Shakambhari (IAST: Cāhamāna), colloquially known as the Chauhans of Sambhar or Chauhans of Ajmer, were an Indian dynasty that ruled parts of the present-day Rajasthan and neighbouring areas in India, between the 6th and 12th centuries. The territory ruled by them was known as Sapadalaksha. They were the most prominent ruling family of the Chahamana (Chauhan) Rajput clan.
 
The Chahamanas originally had their capital at Shakambhari (present-day Sambhar Lake Town). Until the 10th century, they ruled as Pratihara vassals. When the Pratihara power declined after the Tripartite Struggle, the Chahamana ruler Simharaja assumed the title Maharajadhiraja. In the early 12th century, Ajayaraja II moved the kingdom's capital to Ajayameru (modern Ajmer). For this reason, the Chahamana rulers are also known as the "Chauhans of Ajmer".

The Chahamanas fought several wars with their neighbours, including the Chaulukyas of Gujarat, the Tomaras of Delhi, the Paramaras of Malwa and the Chandelas of Bundelkhand. From 11th century onwards, they started facing Muslim invasions, first by the Ghaznavids, and then by the Ghurids. The Chahamana kingdom reached its zenith under Vigraharaja IV in the mid-12th century. The dynasty's power effectively ended in 1192 CE, when the Ghurid invader Muhammad of Ghor defeated and executed Vigraharaja IV's nephew Prithviraj Chauhan.

Origin 
According to the 1170 CE Bijolia rock inscription of Someshvara, the early Chahamana king Samantaraja was born at Ahichchhatrapura in the gotra of sage Vatsa. Historian R. B. Singh theorizes that the Chahamanas probably started out as petty rulers of Ahichchhatrapura (identified with Nagaur), and moved their capital to Shakambhari (Sambhar) as their kingdom grew. Later, they became the vassals of the Imperial Pratiharas.

Several mythical accounts of the dynasty's origin also exist. The earliest of the dynasty's inscriptions and literary works state that the dynasty's progenitor was a legendary hero named Chahamana. They variously state that this hero was born from Indra's eye, in the lineage of the sage Vatsa, in the solar dynasty and/or during a ritual sacrifice performed by Brahma. A popular medieval account classifies the dynasty among the four Agnivanshi Rajput clans, whose ancestors are said to have come out of sacrificial fire pit. The earliest sources to mention this legend are the 16th century recensions of Prithviraj Raso. Some colonial-era historians interpreted this myth to suggest a foreign origin of the dynasty, speculating that the foreign warriors were initiated into the Hindu society through a fire ritual. However, the earliest extant copy of Prithviraj Raso does not mention this legend at all. Instead, it states that the first ruler of the dynasty was Manikya Rai, who is said to have been born from Brahma's sacrifice.

Territory 
The core territory of the Chahamanas was located in present-day Rajasthan. It was known as Sapadalaksha (IAST: Sapādalakṣa) or Jangala-desha (IAST: Jangaladeśa).

The term Jangladesha ("rough and arid country") appears to be older, as it mentioned in the Mahabharata. The text does not mention the exact location of the region. The region is identified with the area around Bikaner.

The term Sapadalaksha (literally "one and a quarter lakhs" or 125,000) refers to the large number of villages in the area. It became prominent during the Chahamana reign. It appears that the term originally referred to the area around modern Nagaur near Bikaner. This area was known as Savalak (vernacular form of Sapadalaksha) in as late as 20th century. The early Chahamana king Samantaraja was based in Ahichchhatrapura, which can be identified with modern Nagaur. The ancient name of Nagaur was Nagapura, which means "the city of the serpent". Ahichchhatrapura has a similar meaning: "the city whose chhatra or protector is serpent".

As the Chahamana territory expanded, the entire region ruled by them came to be known as Sapadalaksha. This included the later Chahamana capitals Ajayameru (Ajmer) and Shakambhari (Sambhar). The term also came to be applied to the larger area captured by the Chahamanas. The early medieval Indian inscriptions and the writings of the contemporary Muslim historians suggest that the following cities were also included in Sapadalaksha: Hansi (now in Haryana), Mandore (now in Marwar region), and Mandalgarh (now in Mewar region).

History 

The earliest historical Chahamana king is the 6th century ruler Vasudeva. According to a mythical account in Prithviraja Vijaya, he received the Sambhar Salt Lake as a gift from a vidyadhara (a supernatural being). Little is known about his immediate successors. The 8th century Chahamana ruler Durlabharaja I and his successors are known to have served the Gurjara-Pratiharas as vassals. In 10th century, Vakpatiraja I made an attempt to overthrow the Gurjara-Pratihara suzerainty, and assumed the title Maharaja ("great king"). His younger son Lakshmana established the Naddula Chahamana branch. Vakpatiraja's elder son and successor Simharaja assumed the title Maharajadhiraja ("king of great kings"), which suggests that he was a sovereign ruler.

Simharaja's successors consolidated the Chahamana power by engaging in wars with their neighbours, including the Chaulukyas of Gujarat and the Tomaras of Delhi. The dynasty's earliest extant inscription (973 CE) is from the reign of Vigraharaja II. During the reign of Viryarama (r. c. 1040 CE), the Paramara king Bhoja invaded the Chahamana kingdom, and probably occupied their capital Shakambhari for a brief period. Chamundaraja restored the Chahamana power, possibly with the help of the Naddula Chahamanas.

The subsequent Chahamana kings faced several Ghaznavid raids. Ajayaraja II (r. c. 1110-1135 CE) repulsed a Ghaznavid attack, and also defeated the Paramara king Naravarman. He moved the kingdom's capital from Shakambhari to Ajayameru (Ajmer), a city that he either established or greatly expanded. His successor Arnoraja raided the Tomara territory, and also repulsed a Ghaznavid invasion. However, he suffered setbacks against the Gujarat Chaulukya kings Jayasimha Siddharaja and Kumarapala, and was killed by his own son Jagaddeva.

Arnoraja's younger son Vigraharaja IV greatly expanded the Chahamana territories, and captured Delhi from the Tomaras. His kingdom included parts of the present-day Rajasthan, Haryana, and Delhi. It probably also included a part of Punjab (to the south-east of Sutlej river) and a portion of the northern Gangetic plain (to the west of Yamuna). His 1164 CE Delhi-Shivalik pillar inscription claims that he conquered the region between the Himalayas and the Vindhyas, and thus restored the rule of Aryans in Aryavarta. While this is an exaggeration, it is not completely baseless. The inscription was originally found in Topra village, near the Shivalik Hills (Himalayan foothills). Also, the exiled ruler of Malwa (Vindhyan region) possibly acknowledged his suzerainty. Thus Vigraharaja's influence extended from the Himalayas to the Vindhyas, at least in name.

Vigraharaja was succeeded by his son Amaragangeya, and then his nephew Prithviraja II. Subsequently, his younger brother Someshvara ascended the throne.

The most celebrated ruler of the dynasty was Someshvara's son Prithviraja III, better known as Prithviraj Chauhan. He defeated several neighbouring kings, including the Chandela ruler Paramardi in 1182–83, although he could not annex the Chandela territory to his kingdom. In 1191, he defeated the Ghurid Empire king Muhammad of Ghor at the first Battle of Tarain. However, the next year, he was defeated at the second Battle of Tarain by Muhammad of Ghor, and subsequently killed.

Muhammad of Ghor appointed Prithviraja's son Govindaraja IV as a vassal. Prithviraja's brother Hariraja dethroned him, and regained control of a part of his ancestral kingdom. Hariraja was defeated by the Ghurids in 1194 CE. Govindaraja was granted the fief of Ranthambore by the Ghurids. There, he established a new branch of the dynasty.

Cultural activities 

The Chahamanas commissioned a number of Hindu temples, several of which were destroyed by the Ghurid invaders after the defeat of Prithviraja III.

Multiple Chahamana rulers contributed to the construction of the Harshanatha temple, which was probably commissioned by Govindaraja I. According to Prithviraja Vijaya:

 Simharaja commissioned a large Shiva temple at Pushkar
 Chamundaraja commissioned a Vishnu temple at Narapura (modern Narwar in Ajmer district)
 Prithviraja I built a food distribution centre (anna-satra) on the road to Somnath temple for pilgrims.
 Someshvara commissioned a number of temples, including five temples in Ajmer.

Vigraharaja IV was known for his patronage to arts and literature, and himself composed the play Harikeli Nataka. The structure that was later converted into the Adhai Din Ka Jhonpra mosque was constructed during his reign.

The Chahamana rulers also patronized Jainism. Vijayasimha Suri's Upadeśāmālavritti (1134 CE) and Chandra Suri's Munisuvrata-Charita (1136 CE) state that Prithviraja I donated golden kalashas (cupolas) for the Jain temples at Ranthambore. The Kharatara-Gachchha-Pattavali states that Ajayaraja II allowed the Jains to build their temples in his capital Ajayameru (Ajmer), and also donated a golden kalasha to a Parshvanatha temple. Someshvara granted the Revna village to a Parshvanatha temple.

List of rulers 

{
	"type": "FeatureCollection",
	"features": [
		{
			"type": "Feature",
			"properties": { "marker-symbol": "star", "marker-color": "302060", "title": "Ajmer", "description": "Adhai Din Ka Jhonpra" },
			"geometry": { "type": "Point", "coordinates": [74.6251327, 26.4552512] }
		},
		{
			"type": "Feature",
			"properties": { "marker-symbol": "monument", "title": "Amalda", "description": "Also known as Anvalda" },
			"geometry": { "type": "Point", "coordinates": [75.1487007, 25.4840273] }
		},
		{
			"type": "Feature",
			"properties": { "marker-symbol": "monument", "title": "Bajta" },
			"geometry": { "type": "Point", "coordinates": [75.2770721, 25.8440912] }
		},
		{
			"type": "Feature",
			"properties": { "marker-symbol": "monument", "title": "Barla" },
			"geometry": { "type": "Point", "coordinates": [72.8382547, 26.6120892] }
		},
		{
			"type": "Feature",
			"properties": { "marker-symbol": "monument", "title": "Bassi" },
			"geometry": { "type": "Point", "coordinates": [76.050499, 26.8391525] }
		},
		{
			"type": "Feature",
			"properties": { "marker-symbol": "monument", "title": "Bijolia" },
			"geometry": { "type": "Point", "coordinates": [75.3266416, 25.1635904] }
		},
		{
			"type": "Feature",
			"properties": { "marker-symbol": "monument", "title": "Bisaldeo temple", "description": "At Bisalpur or Visalapur" },
			"geometry": { "type": "Point", "coordinates": [75.4571403, 25.9271197] }
		},
		{
			"type": "Feature",
			"properties": { "marker-symbol": "monument", "title": "Charla", "description": "Also known as Charlu, in Churu district" },
			"geometry": { "type": "Point", "coordinates": [74.3000878, 27.7084401] }
		},
		{
			"type": "Feature",
			"properties": { "marker-symbol": "monument", "title": "Chittorgarh" },
			"geometry": { "type": "Point", "coordinates": [74.6269216, 24.8887435] }
		},
		{
			"type": "Feature",
			"properties": { "marker-symbol": "monument", "title": "Dhod" },
			"geometry": { "type": "Point", "coordinates": [74.9862056, 27.4923745] }
		},
		{
			"type": "Feature",
			"properties": { "marker-symbol": "monument", "title": "Harsh", "description": "Harshnath temple" },
			"geometry": { "type": "Point", "coordinates": [75.172475, 27.4999733] }
		},
		{
			"type": "Feature",
			"properties": { "marker-symbol": "monument", "title": "Jodhpur" },
			"geometry": { "type": "Point", "coordinates": [73.0243094, 26.2389469] }
		},
		{
			"type": "Feature",
			"properties": { "marker-symbol": "monument", "title": "Kinsariya" },
			"geometry": { "type": "Point", "coordinates": [74.7044425, 26.9350885] }
		},
		{
			"type": "Feature",
			"properties": { "marker-symbol": "monument", "title": "Ladnu", "description": "Also known as Ladnun" },
			"geometry": { "type": "Point", "coordinates": [74.3880699, 27.6442908] }
		},
		{
			"type": "Feature",
			"properties": { "marker-symbol": "monument", "title": "Lohari", "description": "in Bhilwara district" },
			"geometry": { "type": "Point", "coordinates": [75.4, 25.65] }
		},
		{
			"type": "Feature",
			"properties": { "marker-symbol": "monument", "title": "Madanpur", "description": "Issued during Prithviraja III's raid against the Chandelas" },
			"geometry": { "type": "Point", "coordinates": [78.6951795, 24.2510993] }
		},
		{
			"type": "Feature",
			"properties": { "marker-symbol": "monument", "title": "Narhar", "description": "Also known as Narhada or Narhad" },
			"geometry": { "type": "Point", "coordinates": [75.5960745, 28.2944746] }
		},
		{
			"type": "Feature",
			"properties": { "marker-symbol": "monument", "title": "Phalodi" },
			"geometry": { "type": "Point", "coordinates": [72.3589284, 27.1312346] }
		},
		{
			"type": "Feature",
			"properties": { "marker-symbol": "monument", "title": "Pushkar" },
			"geometry": { "type": "Point", "coordinates": [74.5510856, 26.489749] }
		},

		{
			"type": "Feature",
			"properties": { "marker-symbol": "monument", "title": "Rewasa", "description": "Also known as Revasa" },
			"geometry": { "type": "Point", "coordinates": [76.5191968, 27.0925499] }
		},
		{
			"type": "Feature",
			"properties": { "marker-symbol": "monument", "title": "Sewari", "description": "Also known as Sevadi" },
			"geometry": { "type": "Point", "coordinates": [73.297175, 25.0944987] }
		},
		{
			"type": "Feature",
			"properties": { "marker-symbol": "monument", "title": "Tantoti" },
			"geometry": { "type": "Point", "coordinates": [74.8170822, 26.1405014] }
		},
		{
			"type": "Feature",
			"properties": { "marker-symbol": "monument", "title": "Thanwala", "description": "Thanvala" },
			"geometry": { "type": "Point", "coordinates": [74.4649512, 26.557162] }
		},
		{
			"type": "Feature",
			"properties": { "marker-symbol": "monument", "title": "Topra", "description": "Issued during Vigraharaja IV's northern campaign. Now at Delhi." },
			"geometry": { "type": "Point", "coordinates": [77.1623852, 30.1252841] }
		},
		{
			"type": "Feature",
			"properties": { "marker-symbol": "monument", "title": "Udaipur" },
			"geometry": { "type": "Point", "coordinates": [73.712479, 24.585445] }
		},
		{
			"type": "Feature",
			"properties": { "marker-symbol": "monument", "title": "Jeenmata temple", "comment": "Source: Har Bilas Sarda (1941). Ajmer: historical and descriptive, p. 451" },
			"geometry": { "type": "Point", "coordinates": [75.194225, 27.4442969] }
		}
	]
}

Following is a list of Chahamana rulers of Shakambhari and Ajmer, with approximate period of reign, as estimated by R. B. Singh:

References

Bibliography 

 
 
 
 
 
 
 
 

 
Dynasties of India
History of Rajasthan
Rajput rulers
Dynasties of the Rajputs
7th-century establishments in India
12th-century disestablishments in India